Keith Frederick (born November 6, 1952) is an American politician. He is a Republican former member of the Missouri House of Representatives, having served from 2011 to 2019.

References

1952 births
21st-century American politicians
Living people
Republican Party members of the Missouri House of Representatives